Bradley Mousley and Luke Saville were the defending champions but chose to defend their title with different partners. Mousley partnered Alex Bolt and successfully defended his title. Saville partnered Matt Reid but lost in the quarterfinals to Max Purcell and Andrew Whittington.

Bolt and Mousley won the title after defeating Sekou Bangoura and Nathan Pasha 7–6(8–6), 6–0 in the final.

Seeds

Draw

References
 Main Draw

Launceston Tennis International - Men's Doubles
2018 Men's Doubles